The 1952 Wayne Tartars football team was an American football team that represented Wayne University (later renamed Wayne State University) as an independent during the 1952 college football season. Under fourth-year head coach Louis F. Zarza, the team compiled a 4–4 record.

Schedule

References

Wayne
Wayne State Warriors football seasons
Wayne Tartars football